Benjamin Arthur (born 1982) is an animator.

Benjamin Arthur may also refer to:

Benjamin Arthur of the Arthur baronets
Ben Arthur, mountain
Ben Arthur (musician) (born 1973), American singer-songwriter

See also